Hermon is a village in Anglesey, in north-west Wales. It is located roughly halfway between Newborough and Aberffraw, some 6 miles south-west of Llangefni. The nearest railway station is Bodorgan on the North Wales Coast Line. It is in the community of Bodorgan.

The village has a disused windmill named Melin Hermon.

References

Villages in Anglesey
Bodorgan